Orientalium dignitas is a papal encyclical concerning the Eastern Catholic churches issued by Pope Leo XIII on November 30, 1894. The encyclical further established the rights of the Eastern Catholic churches. This includes a prohibition against Latinizing influences among Eastern Catholics, encouragement of Eastern Catholics to remain true to their church traditions, and the expansion of the jurisdiction of the Melkite patriarch to include the whole of the Ottoman Empire.

In the encyclical, Leo said "that the ancient Eastern rites are a witness to the Apostolicity of the Catholic Church, that their diversity, consistent with unity of the faith, is itself a witness to the unity of the Church, that they add to her dignity and honour. He says that the Catholic Church does not possess one rite only, but that she embraces all the ancient rites of Christendom; her unity consists not in a mechanical uniformity of all her parts, but on the contrary, in their variety, according in one principle and vivified by it."

See also
Eastern Catholic Churches
List of encyclicals of Pope Leo XIII

Notes

References

External links
 Orientalium dignitas - On the Churches of the East at Papal Encyclicals Online

Encyclicals of Pope Leo XIII
1894 documents
1894 in Christianity
November 1894 events